is a railway station in Miyakonojō, Miyazaki, Japan.

Lines

Layout 
The station consists of two side platforms serving two tracks with a siding. The station building is a modern functional structure in glass and steel which is unstaffed and serves only to house a waiting area. From the access road, it is necessary to climb a short flight of steps to enter the station building. Getting to the opposite side platform also requires a footbridge.

Adjacent stations

History
On the same day, Isoichi was opened as an intermediate station on the new track. The station and the Kokuto East Line were then absorbed and were designated as part of the Nippō Main Line on 6 December 1932. With the privatization of Japanese National Railways (JNR), the successor of JGR, on 1 April 1987, the station came under the control of JR Kyushu.

Passenger statistics
In fiscal 2016, the station was used by an average of 87 passengers (boarding only) per day.

See also
List of railway stations in Japan

References

External links 

Isoichi  (JR Kyushu)

Railway stations in Miyazaki Prefecture
Railway stations in Japan opened in 1929